is a Japanese footballer currently playing as a centre back for FC Tokyo.

Club career
Born in Yamaguchi, Japan, Higashi started his career with the Yanagito Sports Boy Scouts, before studying at Takagawa Gakuen High School, and eventually joining FC Tokyo. He made his debut in a 0–0 J.League Cup draw with Júbilo Iwata on 15 March 2022, and was praised for helping to keep a clean sheet in his first professional game.

Career statistics

Club
.

Notes

References

2004 births
Living people
Association football people from Yamaguchi Prefecture
Japanese footballers
Japan youth international footballers
Association football defenders
FC Tokyo players